On the Highwire is a compilation album by English rock band Trapeze. Released on 2 December 2003 by Castle Communications, the album features all tracks from the band's 1979 sixth and final studio album Hold On, the 1998 live album Live: Way Back to the Bone and the 1981 live album Live in Texas: Dead Armadillos.

Reception
AllMusic writer Greg Prato claimed that "since On the Highwire skips the group's studio work with Hughes (which is by far the group's strongest work), [it] fails to deliver as a true career overview", noting that the first disc "falls a bit flat" but adding that the second "fares much better, as it focuses on much stronger material".

Track listing

Disc one

Disc two

Personnel

Hold On personnel
Peter Goalby – lead vocals, guitar, production
Mel Galley – lead guitar, vocals, production
Pete Wright – bass, production
Dave Holland – drums, production
Jimmy Miller – production
Rota Sound Strings – arrangements
Brad Davies – engineering
Guy Bidmeade – engineering

''Live: Way Back to the Bone personnelGlenn Hughes – vocals, bass
Mel Galley – guitar
Dave Holland – drumsLive in Texas: Dead Armadillos'' personnel
Peter Goalby – lead vocals
Mel Galley – guitar, vocals, production
Pete Wright – bass
Steve Bray – drums
Malcolm Harper – engineering
Mason Harlow – engineering assistance
John MacKenzie Burns – mixing

References

External links

2003 compilation albums
Trapeze (band) albums
Castle Communications compilation albums